Under the Whyte notation for the classification of steam locomotives by wheel arrangement, a  is an articulated locomotive using a pair of  power units back to back, with the boiler and cab suspended between them. The 2-8-2 wheel arrangement has a single pair of leading wheels in a leading truck, followed by four coupled pairs of driving wheels and a pair of trailing wheels in a trailing truck. Since the 2-8-2 type was known as Mikado, the corresponding Garratt and Modified Fairlie types were usually known as Double Mikado.

Overview
The 2-8-2+2-8-2 wheel arrangement was used by Garratt and Modified Fairlie locomotives.

Garratt locomotives
The Double Mikado was the fourth most common Garratt type, with 144 examples constructed, 114 built by Garratt patent owner Beyer, Peacock & Company and 30 built by others under license. For Spain, sixteen were built to  gauge.

Modified Fairlie locomotives
The South African Railways (SAR), where the Modified Fairlie concept was conceived as a possible alternative to the Garratt, was the only user. The Modified Fairlie was essentially an adaptation of the Kitson-Meyer concept. It was similar in appearance to a Garratt, but with the boiler, cab, coal and water bunkers all mounted on a single rigid frame which pivoted on the engine units, with the pivot centers located approximately at the centre of the rigid wheelbase of each engine unit. In the Garratt design, by comparison, the coal and water bunkers are mounted directly on the engine units and swivel with them, while the boiler, firebox and cab are mounted on a rigid frame which is suspended between the two engine units.

Usage

South Africa
Between 1925 and 1931, the SAR placed eighteen  Class GE Garratts in service, all built by Beyer, Peacock & Company between 1924 and 1930. The first six entered service in 1925 and proved so successful that a second order for ten was placed in 1926. Another two locomotives entered service in 1931. All of them had Belpaire fireboxes, plate frames, Walschaerts valve gear and were superheated. The locomotive was an enlargement of the Class GD 2-6-2+2-6-2 Double Prairie and was designed as a heavy goods locomotive for use on light  rail. They were the first eight-coupled Garratts to be built for the SAR and, on a tractive effort basis at the time of their introduction, they were the most powerful locomotives operating on light track in Africa and the Southern Hemisphere.

In 1927, the SAR placed ten Class HF Modified Fairlie Double Mikados in service, followed by an eleventh one in 1928. The locomotive was designed by the SAR under the direction of Colonel F.R. Collins DSO, SAR Chief Mechanical Engineer from 1922 to 1929, and was built by Henschel & Son in 1926 and 1927, hence the designation of Class HF for "Henschel Fairlie". Designed for mainline work, it was the Modified Fairlie equivalent of the Class GE Garratt which was similar in both size and mechanical respects. It had Walschaerts valve gear, a bar frame and was superheated, with a round-topped firebox.

The Class HF proved to be a powerful locomotive, but it was less successful than its Garratt equivalent. The pivot bearings were subject to quite rapid wear since they carried a considerable additional load compared to those on the Garratt, as a result of the water and coal bunkers which were mounted on the main frame instead of on the engine units. This resulted in increased maintenance and, as a consequence, increased operating cost. No more locomotives of the Modified Fairlie design were acquired by the SAR.

References

External links

 
 
8,2-8-2